Patrik Eler (born 13 June 1991) is a Slovenian footballer who plays as a forward for Austrian club SV Stripfing.

Club career
On 3 September 2020, he signed with SV Horn.

In July 2021, he joined Austrian Regionalliga East club SV Stripfing.

References

External links
 
 

1991 births
Living people
People from Šempeter pri Gorici
Association football forwards
Slovenian footballers
Slovenian expatriate footballers
Expatriate footballers in Austria
Slovenian expatriate sportspeople in Austria
Expatriate footballers in France
Slovenian expatriate sportspeople in France
SK Austria Klagenfurt players
FC Wacker Innsbruck (2002) players
AS Nancy Lorraine players
SV Ried players
SC Austria Lustenau players
SV Horn players
Ligue 2 players
Austrian Football Bundesliga players
2. Liga (Austria) players
Austrian Regionalliga players